Shattered Glass may refer to:

 Shattered Glass (film)
 "Shattered Glass" (song), by Laura Branigan
 "Shattered Glass", a song by Britney Spears
 "Shattered Glass", a Transformers continuity where the Autobots are evil and the Decepticons are good

See also
 Shattered Mirror (disambiguation)
Broken Glass (disambiguation)